Gelechia hyoscyamella is a moth of the family Gelechiidae. It is found in Egypt.

The wingspan is 11–12 mm. The forewings are ochreous-yellow, sprinkled with brownish and with brownish ill-defined streaks. The hindwings are grey, with ochreous-yellow margins.

References

Moths described in 1912
Gelechia